Kulogora is a rural locality (a village) in Pinezhsky District, Arkhangelsk Oblast, Russia. The population was 78 as of 2012.

Geography 
Kulogora is located 134 km northwest of Karpogory (the district's administrative centre) by road. Pinega is the nearest rural locality.

References 

Rural localities in Pinezhsky District